The Biesdorfer Baggersee is an excavation lake located in the locality (Ortsteil) of Biesdorf within the borough (Bezirk) of Marzahn-Hellersdorf in Berlin, Germany. It is one of the largest quarry ponds in the Berlin area.

Geography
Biesdorfer Baggersee lies in a largely built-up area. A large filter system for rainwater is located a few meters west of its bank. The shore is overgrown with reeds, trees, and other vegetation on most parts of the lake. Only in the north is the shore area protected from entering by a fence. In the south of the lake, there are two separate sandy beaches, which are not approved for swimming. Several wooden loungers were installed at the lake and a volleyball court was created. The species of fish commonly found in the lake are carp, pike and roach.

History
Biesdorfer Baggersee was originally created in the 19th century as a gravel pit, from which sand and gravel were removed for the new development areas in the area. When mining stopped and all machines were removed, the pit filled with groundwater and rainwater. Today, Biesdorfer Baggersee is a biotope in which many animals and plants live.

Usage

In the Summer months, Biesdorfer Baggersee is used as a bathing lake, although it is not open to bathing due to the poor water quality.

In 2020, there was also a lively rush here regardless of social distancing rules. In the Spring of 2021, the district office made the bathing area unusable by creating a rock embankment between the lawn and the lake for around 90,000 euros.

References

Lakes of Berlin
Marzahn-Hellersdorf
Artificial lakes of Germany